"Faubourg" is an ancient French term historically equivalent to "fore-town" (now often termed suburb or ). Traditionally, this name was given to an agglomeration forming around a throughway leading outwards from a city gate, and usually took the name of the same thoroughfare within the city. As cities were often located atop hills (for defensive purposes), their outlying communities were frequently lower down.

Faubourgs are sometimes considered the predecessor of European suburbs, into which they sometimes evolved in the 1950s and 1960s, while others underwent further urbanisation. Although early suburbs still conserved some characteristics related to faubourgs (such as the back alleys with doors, little break margins for houses), later suburbs underwent major changes in their construction, primarily in terms of residential density.

Beside many French cities,  can still be found outside Europe include the province of Quebec in Canada and the city of New Orleans in the United States.

Paris
Faubourgs were prominent around Paris since the 16th century. At that time, Paris was surrounded by a city wall. But even outside the Louis XIII wall there were urbanised areas, and those were called faubourgs.

In 1860, the border of the city was once more transferred a few kilometers outwards to where it still is.  Haussmann's renovation of Paris erased many traces of ancient faubourgs and the term banlieue was then coined.

For instance, the  used to be located outside of the city wall and was an extension of the  within the walls. The  came about in a similar manner.

New Orleans 

Montreal 
Greater Montreal no longer has any actual  on the main island, as the suburb now refers to the North and South Shores.

Québec City 
The term  is still alive in Quebec City, where it is mostly used to designate the  neighbourhood, often called  or even  by its inhabitants.

See also
 , the German equivalent

References

Geography of France
Neighborhoods in New Orleans
Urban studies and planning terminology